Bulus Farah was a Palestinian trade unionist who founded the Federation of Arab Trade Unions and Labor Societies in 1942. Farah went to work in the Haifa workshops in 1925 as a fifteen-year-old apprentice and is also known as the author of a book on the railway workers of the post-World War I period entitled Min al-'uthmaniyya ila al-dawla al-'ibriyya (Endelman, 1997, p. 263). He was one of the first Arab leaders of the Palestine Communist Party to go to study in Moscow at the Communist University of the Toilers of the East.

References

Endelman, Todd M. (1997). Comparing Jewish Societies. University of Michigan Press. 

Palestinian activists
Living people
Communist University of the Toilers of the East alumni
Year of birth missing (living people)